Nokere Koerse is a European semi classic single day cycle race held in the Belgian region of Flanders. Since 2005, the race has been organized as a 1.1 event on the UCI Europe Tour. Starting in 2016 it was a 1.HC event. The Nokere Koerse was created in 1944, initially as the Grand Prix Jules Lowie in honour of 1938 Paris–Nice winner Jules Lowie who was born in Nokere. Only seven cyclists not born in Belgium or the Netherlands have won this semi classic. There was no edition in 2013 due to bad winter weather.

Since 2019, a women's edition of Nokere Koerse is held on the same day as the men's race, starting and finishing in the same location.

Winners (men)

Junior race
Sincew 2016 a junior edition of the race has existed.

Winners (women)

References

External links
Official Website 

 
Cycle races in Belgium
UCI Europe Tour races
Recurring sporting events established in 1944
1944 establishments in Belgium
Kruishoutem